Grisman is a surname. Notable people with the surname include:

David Grisman (born 1945), American mandolinist and composer of acoustic music
David Grisman Quintet
Jack Grisman (1914–1944), Royal Air Force officer

See also
Grissmann